Vann Nath (1946 – 5 September 2011) was a Cambodian painter, artist, writer, and human rights activist. He was the eighth Cambodian to win the Lillian Hellman/Hammett Award since 1995. He was one of only seven known adult survivors of S-21 camp, where 20,000 Cambodians were tortured and executed during the Khmer Rouge regime (Democratic Kampuchea).

Biography
Vann Nath was born in Phum Sophy village, Srok Battambang district, Battambang Province in northwestern Cambodia. The exact date and year of his birth is unknown, but it was common for poor Cambodians born in rural areas not to have a proper birth certificate. He was educated at Wat Sopee pagoda as a child. His parents were separated, and he had two brothers and an older sister. They earned a living by selling a type of Khmer rice noodles called num banhchok. They were so poor that Nath had no chance to get a proper education. By the time he was 14 or 15, he was working at factory jobs for 500-600 riel a month (less than US$0.25).

Nath became interested in painting while he was studying at Wat Sopee pagoda. "I became very attracted to painting when I went into the pagoda and I saw people painting a picture on the side of the wall of a temple." Instead of pursuing painting, he served as a monk from the age of 17 to 21. "Every family has a son...one of the sons must go and serve as a monk — it is considered bad for the Cambodian family to not have a son who is a monk", says Vann Nath.

When his sister died, Vann Nath left the monkhood to start working to help support the family. He enrolled in a private painting school in 1965. "School was far from my house, and I couldn't afford a bicycle. Because our family life was hard, only my mother was working to support the whole family and she became older and older and I had to pay the tuition for the painting school." Later, the school allowed Vann Nath to work there in exchange for the tuition fee. After two years, he was able to profit from his own painting work.

Khmer Rouge
At the time of his arrest on 7 January 1978, Vann Nath was working in a rice field in his home province of Battambang like many other Battambang locals. The Khmer Rouge took him to Wat Kandal, a Buddhist temple used as a detainment center. They told him that he was accused of violating the moral code of the organization of Angkar. He did not understand what that meant.

A week later, he was transferred and deported to a security prison in Phnom Penh. This security prison is known as S-21 by the Khmer Rouge and it was formerly a high school known as Chao Ponhea Yat high school. There, people were interrogated, tortured and executed on a daily basis. After the Vietnamese invasion in 1979 and the fall of the Khmer Rouge regime, only seven adult prisoners made it out of the prison alive. Vann Nath was one of them.

Career
Vann Nath was a painter and writer whose memoirs and paintings of his experiences in the infamous Tuol Sleng prison are a powerful and poignant testimony to the crimes of the Khmer Rouge and the communist regime.

Vann Nath was an outspoken advocate for justice for victims of the crimes of the Khmer Rouge and this is reflected in his writing. His 1998 memoir A Cambodian Prison Portrait: One Year in the Khmer Rouge's S-21 Prison, about his experiences at S-21, at that time was the only written account by a survivor of the prison. It has been translated from English into French and Swedish.

Vann Nath was one of Cambodia's most prominent artists. His life was only spared by his captor, Comrade Duch, so that he could be put to work on painting and sculpting portraits of Pol Pot. He played an important role in helping to revive the arts in Cambodia after decades of war and genocide.

During 2001 and 2002, Vann Nath worked intensively with Cambodian film director Rithy Panh in the preparation of a documentary film entitled S-21: The Khmer Rouge Killing Machine. Vann Nath was interviewed in the film, in which Panh brought together former prisoners and guards of the former Tuol Sleng prison. Vann Nath confronted and questioned his former torturers in the documentary film. To recognize their work, both Vann Nath and Rithy Panh have been conferred the title of Dr honoris causa by the University of Paris VIII on 24 May 2011.

Honours
He was a recipient of Lillian Hellman/Hammett Award, which recognises courage in the face of political persecution, which he faced during the Khmer Rouge.

Illness
Despite battling long-standing health problems, including chronic kidney disease, Vann Nath continued to paint and write about his experiences under the Pol Pot regime. He suffered from a heart attack and went into a coma. He died on 5 September 2011 at the Calmette Hospital in Phnom Penh. He was approximately 65 years old.

See also

 Comrade Duch
 John Dawson Dewhirst
 Eufrosinia Kersnovskaya
 Chum Mey
 Bou Meng
 Tuol Sleng
 Torture

References

External links

Vann Nath - The Lives They Lived - New York Times Magazine 2011
Vann Nath - Paint Propaganda or Die - The Art History Archive
Vann Nath, The Economist, 17 September 2011

Cambodian painters
1946 births
2011 deaths
Cambodian male writers
Cambodian sculptors
Cambodian genocide survivors
People from Phnom Penh
Cambodian human rights activists
Cambodian writers
20th-century painters
20th-century sculptors
20th-century male writers
People from Battambang province
Male painters
Male sculptors
20th-century Cambodian artists
21st-century Cambodian artists
20th-century Cambodian writers
21st-century Cambodian writers